Blonde Ambition is the third novel in the A-List series by Zoey Dean.  It was published in September 2004.

Plot summary
Ben and Anna are now officially together but their reunion is interrupted when Jonathan, Anna's father, calls back Anna to bid farewell to her sister Susan, who has decided to enroll back into rehab. Anna. Anna considers their farewell to be intimate and is surprised when Ben tags along though she does not voice her displeasure. 

Back at Apex, Margaret informs Anna that leaving an industry party to take a drunk Susan home was unacceptable and is about to fire her when Clark Sheppard intervenes. He takes Anna as his intern and assigns her to work on the new hit soap opera Hermosa Beach. Anna meets the young and charming co-executive producer Danny Bluestone and enjoys working on a TV set, despite the unfamiliar terms and erratic actors. Ben gets jealous of Anna spending time with Danny and the Percys' driver Django and Anna becomes concerned that Ben is neglecting his studies at Princeton. After a heart to heart, the two break up again and Ben reluctantly returns to Princeton.

Meanwhile, Cammie feels increasingly deserted by her friends: Dee is enamored with her new boyfriend Stevie while Sam seems to be showing interest in Adam Flood. To further her dismay, her step-mother announces that her daughter, Mia, will be moving in. Cammie initially hates Mia, a secretive fourteen-year-old Valley girl, but takes her out shopping in order to not feel alone. Cammie kisses Adam at a party in an attempt to punish Sam but is pleasantly surprised at their chemistry.

She follows Adam to a Beck concert and the two are invited to a rave afterwards. Cammie and Adam kiss again but are interrupted by Dee who nonchalantly mentions she invited Mia along with her as well. Cammie's protective instincts kick in and the three go find Mia at the party and take her home. Cammie reveals to Adam that even though she doesn't like Mia, Mia reminds her of how she acted after her mom died. Cammie mentions that she wishes that she had a big sister to keep her from making stupid choices. However, the next day, Cammie becomes frustrated at Mia's self-destructive attitude and decides she can't be Mia's rescuer.

Meanwhile, Adam tells Cammie that they should slow down their relationship because he still has feelings for Anna. Enraged, Cammie  leaks sensitive information about Hermosa Beach to the press under Anna's name. Clark fires Anna and forbids anyone from work associating with her. Anna tries to explain to Danny her side of the story but he sadly tells her that he can't been seen with her or else he will lose his career.

Sam helps Anna realize the true culprit and their plot for revenge comes to fruition at Cammie's 18th birthday party, where Cammie's credit and debit cards are publicly declined by the party planner and her BMW is towed. At home, Clark reveals that he knows Cammie was the true leak, thanks to Mia who collaborated with Sam and Anna to clear Anna's name. 

In the morning, Adam shows up to comfort Cammie and the two go on a quiet date to the park while Clark half-heartedly apologizes to Anna for the mistake and offers her job back. Anna politely declines and then surprises Danny at his office. He leaves work early for her and the two go on a date.

2004 American novels
American young adult novels

Little, Brown and Company books